is a professional Japanese baseball player. He is a pitcher for the Hiroshima Toyo Carp of Nippon Professional Baseball (NPB).

References 

1999 births
Living people
Nippon Professional Baseball pitchers
Baseball people from Ibaraki Prefecture
Hiroshima Toyo Carp players
People from Tsuchiura